Cascade Lake may refer to:

Lakes in the United States
 Cascade Lake (California)
 Lake Cascade, formerly Cascade Reservoir, Idaho
 Cascade Lake (Cook County, Minnesota)
 Cascade Lake (Montana), in the List of lakes in Sweet Grass County, Montana
 Cascade Lake (New York)
 Cascade Lakes, a collection of lakes in Oregon
 South Cascade Lake, Washington

Other uses
 Cascade Lake (microarchitecture), an Intel processor microarchitecture

See also
 Lake Cascade State Park, a state park in Idaho, US
 Cascade Pond, New York, US
 South Cascade Glacier, Washington, US